Alan Cronin (born 1979) is an Irish retired Gaelic footballer who played for club side Nemo Rangers, at inter-county level with the Cork senior football team and with Munster. His brother, Martin Cronin, also played Gaelic football.

Honours

Nemo Rangers
All-Ireland Senior Club Football Championship: 2003
Munster Senior Club Football Championship: 2000, 2001, 2002, 2005, 2007, 2010
Cork Senior Football Championship: 2000, 2001, 2002, 2005, 2006, 2007, 2008, 2010, 2015

Cork
Munster Senior Football Championship: 2002, 2006

References

1979 births
Living people
Nemo Rangers Gaelic footballers
Cork inter-county Gaelic footballers
Munster inter-provincial Gaelic footballers